The Book of Thoth: A Short Essay on the Tarot of the Egyptians is the title of The Equinox, volume III, number 5, by English author and occultist Aleister Crowley. The publication date is recorded as the vernal equinox of 1944 (an Ixviii Sol in 0° 0' 0" Aries, March 21, 1944 e. v. 5:29 p.m.) and was originally published in an edition limited to 200 numbered and signed copies.

Overview
This book describes the philosophy and the use of Aleister Crowley's Thoth Tarot, a deck of Tarot cards designed by Crowley himself and co-designed and painted by Lady Frieda Harris. The Thoth Tarot has become one of the best-selling and most popular Tarot Decks in the world.

The original signed limited edition was bound in Moroccan leather and printed on pre-wartime paper. Crowley sold £1,500 worth of the edition (equal to £57,540 in 2013) in less than three months.

Content
The book is divided into four major parts:

Part One: The Theory of the Tarot.
Part Two: The Atu (Keys or Trumps).
Part Three: The Court Cards.
Part Four: The Small Cards.

Part One is further divided into three chapters; Part Two into two chapters and an appendix; Part Three into one chapter; and Part Four into one chapter. The book includes a list of plates depicting the Tarot cards as seen by Crowley and Harris.

There is an Appendix A: the use of the Tarot in the Art of Divination; and an Appendix B which includes the obiter dictum: "the 'correspondences' are not arbitrary". Appendix B also includes the Key Scale of the Tree of Life with the conic sections of mathematics and a diagram attributing the trigrams of the I Ching to the ten Sephirot.

Editions
Weiser Books, 1969. 
U.S. Games Systems, October 1977.

See also
 Magick
 Thelema
 Works of Aleister Crowley
 The Book of Thoth of Egyptian mythology

References

Further reading
 The Crowley Tarot: The Handbook to the Cards, by Akron & Hajo Banzhaf. U.S. Games Systems, August 1995. 
 Keywords for the Crowley Tarot, by Hajo Banzhaf & Brigitte Theler. Weiser Books, July 2001. 
 Understanding Aleister Crowley's Thoth Tarot, by Lon Milo Duquette. Weiser Books, November 2003. 
 The Thoth Companion, by Michael Osiris Snuffin. Llewellyn Worldwide, November 2007.

External links
Tarot, Astrology, Dreams & Horoscopes

1944 books
Tarotology
Thelemite texts
Works by Aleister Crowley